"Hey Hey Hey" is a Katy Perry song. It may also refer to:

Music:
 "Hey Hey Hey (Pop Another Bottle)", a song by Belgian DJ Laurent Wéry, featuring vocals from Dev & Swift K.I.D.
 "Hey, Hey, Hey", a song from the soundtrack for the film Clambake by Elvis Presley
 "Hey, Hey, Hey", a song from The Sound of Sunshine by Michael Franti and Spearhead
 "Hey! Hey! Hey!", a song from Something to Crow About by The Riverboat Gamblers
 "Hey Hey Hey", a 2009 song from Happy Hour by Uncle Kracker
 Hey! Hey! Hey! Music Champ, a Japanese music variety show on Fuji TV

Expressions:
 "Hey hey hey!", catchphrase of the character Fat Albert in the animated TV series Fat Albert and the Cosby Kids
 "Hey hey hey!", catchphrase of the character Dwayne in the TV series What's Happening!!

See also
 Hey (disambiguation)
 Hey Hey (disambiguation)
 "Hey-Hey-Hey-Hey!", a song written and first recorded by Little Richard